"Flower" is a song by the American rock band Soundgarden. Featuring lyrics written by frontman Chris Cornell and music written by guitarist Kim Thayil, "Flower" was released in May 1989 as the only single from the band's debut album, Ultramega OK (1988). The song was included on Soundgarden's 1997 greatest hits album, A-Sides. An alternate BBC version of "Flower"  recorded on 14 May 1989 appeared on the Deluxe Edition of the band's 2010 compilation album Telephantasm.

Origin and recording
"Flower" features lyrics written by frontman Chris Cornell and music written by guitarist Kim Thayil. Thayil on the song:
This song marks the first time I ever blew on a guitar. I put the guitar down on the ground near the amp to get a humming feedback, as opposed to a squealy one, and blew across the strings in rhythm with the drums. There's probably some obscure Mississippi blues guitarist like 'Blind Lemon Pledge' who's done that before, but "Flower" is the first time any rock band had recorded the sound of someone blowing across the strings. It sounds like a sitar.

Composition
Thayil stated, "On the song "Flower" from Ultramega OK, loads of people asked me how I played that so fast—they think I'm playing all these wild barre chords. It's just tuning the bottom E down to D!"

Lyrics
Regarding "Flower", Cornell said "it's about a girl ... who becomes a woman and basically invests everything in vanity and then burns out quick."

Release and reception
"Flower" was released as a single in 1989 with a previously unreleased B-side titled "Toy Box". The B-side "Head Injury" can be found on the Ultramega OK album. "Toy Box" was recorded during the sessions for Soundgarden's first EP, Screaming Life. "Flower" was the only single released from Ultramega OK. The cover photo of the single was taken by Charles Peterson, a noted photographer of the early Seattle music scene.
A "BBC Version" of "Flower" was recorded on 14 May 1989 for John Peel at the Hippodrome in Golders Green, London and appears on the Deluxe Edition of the band's 2010 compilation album Telephantasm.

Music video
Released in late 1988, the black-and-white music video for "Flower", directed by Mark Miremont, features the band performing the song amid scenes of the band members wandering around a city. As Soundgarden's first music video, the video was put into rotation on MTV's underground alternative music show, 120 Minutes, and subsequently helped the burgeoning Seattle grunge scene gain attention and exposure to a somewhat mainstream audience. The video uses the alternate BBC version of the song.

Track listing
"Flower" (Chris Cornell; Kim Thayil) – 3:25
"Head Injury" (Cornell) – 2:22
"Toy Box" (Hiro Yamamoto; Thayil, Yamamoto) – 5:39

Accolades

References

1989 singles
1989 songs
Song recordings produced by Chris Cornell
Song recordings produced by Matt Cameron
Songs written by Chris Cornell
Songs written by Kim Thayil
Soundgarden songs
SST Records singles